Cinnamomum oliveri is a rainforest tree growing at the eastern coastal parts of Australia. It grows from the Illawarra district (34° S) in New South Wales to Cape York Peninsula at the northern tip of Australia. The southernmost limit of natural distribution is on the volcanic cliffs above the town of Gerroa and nearby on the sand in rainforest behind Seven Mile Beach, New South Wales.

Named after Daniel Oliver of Kew Gardens. Cinnamomum oliveri, has several common names, such as the camphorwood, Oliver's sassafras, black sassafras and cinnamonwood. It is a medium to large tree to around 30 metres tall and 75 cm in diameter.

Habitat 
Common in warm temperate rainforest areas on sedimentary soils in cool mountain situations. But also seen in subtropical rainforest.

Description

Trunk, bark and leaves 
The trunk is cylindrical or occasionally flanged. Grey or brown bark with a corky layer. The trunk has vertical lines of corky pustules.

Leaves are opposite, simple, entire wavy margins, smooth, lanceolate, pointed, gradually tapering to the base. 8 to 15 cm long, 2 to 4 cm broad. Shiny green above, bluish grey glaucous below. Leaf stalk 6 to 12 mm long. Leaf venation is distinct on both surfaces. The midrib is raised on both surfaces.

Flowers, fruit and germination 
Flowers appear from October to November. Cream, fragrant, in panicles at the ends of branchlets or in the forks of leaves near the ends of the branchlets. The fruit is a blue-black or black oval, shiny, aromatic drupe. Often with galls. About 12 mm long. Fruit ripe February to April. Fruiting occurs roughly every seven years, and is prolific.

Fruit is eaten by rainforest birds including the white-headed pigeon, pied currawong and green catbird. Like most Australian laurel fruit, removal of the fleshy aril is advised to assist seed germination. The seed has short longevity due to deterioration on drying.

Uses 
The bark of Cinnamomum oliveri contains tannin, also an essential oil, rich in camphor, safrole and methyleugenol or cinnamic aldehyde and eugenol depending on the chemical variety of the species.  The oil may be used for medicinal purposes. The fragrant timber is used for indoor work, lining and cabinet work. Weight 560 to 660 kilograms per cubic metre.

Gallery

References

External links
  (other publication details, included in citation)

Flora of New South Wales
Flora of Queensland
Laurales of Australia
Plants described in 1892
Trees of Australia
oliveri